State assembly elections were held in Malaysia on 21 October 1990 in all states except Sabah (where they were held on 16 and 17 July) and Sarawak (where they were not held until the following year). The Barisan Nasional won ten out of the 11 elections. The Muslim Unity Movement won all 39 state seats in Kelantan to form the state government, with 24 seats going to the Pan-Malaysian Islamic Party and 15 for Semangat 46.

Results

Perlis

Kedah

Kelantan

Terengganu

Penang

Perak

Pahang

Selangor

Negeri Sembilan

Malacca

Johor

Sabah

References

State elections in Malaysia
state